Universiti Malaysia Pahang (literally meaning University of Malaysia of Pahang, abbreviated as UMP) is a public technical university in Pahang, Malaysia. It was formerly known as University College of Engineering and Technology Malaysia, abbreviated as UTEC or KUKTEM.

On 28 November 2015, UMP had been granted an autonomous status where controls towards the financial, human resources and administration had been fully passed to the university.

History

UMP was established as a public technical university by the Malaysian government on 16 February 2002. Incorporated under the Universities and University Colleges Act 1971 by the Royal Decree of His Majesty the Yang DiPertuan Agong, University College of Engineering and Technology Malaysia was set up as a technical university, specialising in engineering and technology. The university college operates on a temporary campus in Gambang, Pahang. The temporary campus was formerly an industrial complex owned by Malaysia Electric Corporation (MEC). The university's permanent campus is located in Pekan, which is under construction.

On 20 September 2006, the Malaysian government agreed to rename University College of Engineering and Technology Malaysia to Universiti Malaysia Pahang, with the change came into effect on 1 February 2007.

Faculties 
 Faculty of Computing
 Faculty of Mechanical and Automotive Engineering Technology
 Faculty of Engineering Technology
 Faculty of Industrial Sciences and Technology
 Faculty of Electrical and Electronic Engineering Technology
 Faculty of Chemical and Process Engineering Technology
 Faculty of Manufacturing and Mechatronic Engineering Technology
 Faculty of Civil Engineering Technology
 Faculty of Industrial Management

Centres 
 Centre for Human Sciences
 Centre for Modern Languages
 Centre for Mathematical Sciences

Facilities 

Facilities provided include:
 The dormitory is known as Kolej Kediaman in Malay  (English: Residential College). The dormitory is divided into two:
 Residential College 1 and 3 consists of 15 blocks. Each block consists of four floors, each with 12 rooms, two study rooms and washrooms. Four students are assigned to each room.
 Residential College 2 is a new dormitory complex consisting of terrace houses. It is for male students only. First year and above male students are assigned here.
 Residential College 4: UMP rented shop lots to accommodate the increasing number of students. Next to Lebuhraya Tun Razak, it consists of blocks A, B, and C.
 Residential College 5: an apartment style dormitory, it was the first residence complex built in UMP Pekan. It consists of nine blocks: Block A, B, C, D, E and F are the male dormitory while G, H, and I are for female students. It is occupied by mechanical, electrical, and manufacturing students as they are the early group of faculties which were placed at UMP Pekan before all faculties are to be transferred to UMP Pekan Campus by 2016.
 Internet access: almost all area in the campus has Wi-Fi coverage In addition there are LAN ports for students to connect to the Internet via LAN cable at locations such as dormitory study rooms and library. The university has fixed the LAN ports in every room in each hostel.
 Malaysia's main ISP (Internet service provider), TMNET, provides wireless internet access service. Known as TMNET Hotspot, it provides a higher speed wireless Internet access at limited locations for 19 Malaysian ringgit per month.
 Library: The library in UMP Pekan was built by a lake, making UMP Pekan bearing the nickname UMP Lakeside Campus.
 Lecture halls/rooms
 Labs (separated according to faculties).
 Cafeteria
 Sport facilities — field, gym, basketball court, badminton court etc.
 Mosque
 Clinic

UMP Pekan Campus 
UMP main campus in Pekan began its operation in 27 July 2009. It is equipped with
 Student Centre
 Hostel and Cafeterias
 Lakes for water activities (e.g.: kayak)
 Free WiFi
 Faculty of Mechanical and Automotive Engineering Technology
 Faculty of Electrical and Electronic Engineering Technology
 Faculty of Manufacturing and Mechatronic Engineering Technology
 Faculty of Computing 
 Centre for Modern Languages
 Library
 Clinic

Rankings

Notable figures 
The alumni and student of Universiti Malaysia Pahang excelled in various fields, among the notable figures are
 Syed Mohamad Hamzah al-Junid Bin Syed Abdul Rahman, former managing director of AJ Infinite (M) Sdn. Bhd.

Presence in media 
The main campus were the set for a television comedy, Namaku Bedah (2017).

Media 
 Twitter
 The official Universiti Malaysia Pahang Twitter account is https://twitter.com/umpmalaysia
 UMP may also be discovered through hashtag #UMPGambang, #UMPPekan, #UMPGambangCity, and #UMPLakeSide

See also
 List of universities in Malaysia

References

External links 
 

Universities and colleges in Pahang
Public universities in Malaysia
Educational institutions established in 2002
Technical universities and colleges in Malaysia
Engineering universities and colleges in Malaysia
Information technology schools in Malaysia
2002 establishments in Malaysia